Southwest Historic District is a national historic district located at Roanoke, Virginia.  It encompasses 1,547 contributing buildings constructed between 1882 and 1930 in the Roanoke neighborhoods of Old Southwest, Mountain View, and Hurt Park.  It is a primarily residential district with houses in a variety of popular late-19th and early-20th century architectural styles. The district also includes a small number of commercial structures, churches, and two schools.

It was listed on the National Register of Historic Places in 1985.

References

Historic districts on the National Register of Historic Places in Virginia
Buildings and structures in Roanoke, Virginia
National Register of Historic Places in Roanoke, Virginia